This is a list of rulers of Kano since the establishment of the Bagauda Dynasty in 998. The early rulers are known almost exclusively from a single source, the Kano Chronicle, which was composed in the late 19th century.

Bagauda dynasty (998–1809) 

Names and dates taken from John Stewart's African States and Rulers (1989):

Kings (998 – 1349)

Sultans (1349 – 1807)

Suleiman's reign (1807–1819)

Dabo dynasty (1819–present)

Lineages

Hausa rulers

Fulani rulers

See also

Hausa Kingdoms
Kano Chronicle
Timeline of Kano

References

Rulers, list
Rulers of Kano
Nigerian traditional rulers
Nigeria-related lists
Emirs of Kano